"Man Hunt" is the twelfth episode of the third series of the British comedy series Dad's Army. It was originally transmitted on Thursday 27 November 1969.

Synopsis
Walker brings along a tracker dog for the platoon and several dozen pairs of knickers for the ladies of Walmington-on-Sea.

Plot
It is eighteen months since the outbreak of World War II and Captain Mainwaring is giving a lecture on the progress of the war, and admits that they have thrown the Allies out of Greece and Crete, but reminds them that Rudolf Hess surrendered not too long ago, so the rats are leaving the sinking ship. However, he tells the platoon that the enemy are dropping empty parachutes to confuse the people, and if they spot one, they must report it to GHQ. Jones wonders what the difference is between British parachutes and Nazi parachutes. Mainwaring's memo tells him that British parachutes are white, while Nazi parachutes are a dirty, creamy, off-white. Frazer points out that the parachutist may be miles away by the time they find the parachute, so Walker decides to bring a tracker dog to the next parade.

After the parade, Jones decides to go to the pub, but Walker has to talk to Mainwaring. He confides in Mainwaring and Wilson that he found a parachute not long ago. Mainwaring is anxious to know whether it was white or cream. Walker cannot remember, as he sold it on his stall as part of eight dozen pairs of ladies' knickers. He, Mainwaring and Wilson now have the unenviable task of trying to find a pair among the citizens of Walmington-on-Sea.

Unsurprisingly, they have no luck, except a young lady who has no hesitation in showing Wilson her blue knickers. The people they have questioned complain to ARP Warden Hodges, who leaves Mainwaring in a tough situation when a pair of knickers emerges from a letterbox.

During a stealth practice the next day, Walker brings in the tracker dog. They test the dog's sniffing power by having Jones pretending to be a Nazi parachutist. They remove Jones's jacket and allow the dog to pick up his scent. As they head up the church hall stairs, Mrs Pike arrives to remind Wilson about their tête-a-tête supper. As the platoon, Jones and the dog come charging down the stairs, they knock down Mrs Pike, revealing her underwear. Walker remembers that he sold the last pair of knickers to Mrs Pike, and they're white: it was a British parachute.

Some time later, Hodges notices a parachute stuck in a tree. He is so busy trying to get it down that he unwittingly gives directions to Downsend Woods for a man with a peculiar German accent. Just as he removes the parachute, the platoon arrive, and after Hodges is mistaken for the parachutist, it isn't long before the dog picks up the scent. Hodges tells Mainwaring about the man with the German accent, and it isn't long before they spot him.

They follow him to a barn containing a Pekingese dog, a big mansion that was bombed in an air raid the previous year and into a dilapidated old house, where they confront him. However, it turns out he's a Viennese ornithologist, having found a golden oriole bird's egg (which the platoon initially mistake for a grenade). Mainwaring asks the man why he kept running away. The man explains that since the oriole bird is protected, it is illegal to take its eggs.

Suddenly, the real German parachutist comes barging in, angry that the platoon keeps running away because he has been trying to surrender to them.

Cast

Arthur Lowe as Captain Mainwaring
John Le Mesurier as Sergeant Wilson
Clive Dunn as Lance-Corporal Jones
John Laurie as Private Frazer
James Beck as Private Walker
Arnold Ridley as Private Godfrey
Ian Lavender as Private Pike
Bill Pertwee as ARP Warden Hodges
Janet Davies as Mrs Pike
Patrick Tull as Suspect
Robert Moore as Large Man
Leon Cortez as Small Man
Olive Mercer as Fierce Lady
Miranda Hampton as Sexy Lady
Robert Aldous as German Parachutist
Bran (the dog) as himself

Radio episode
The equivalent radio episode is entitled The Great White Hunter. It was first broadcast on 30 May 1975. The hunt for the parachutist is omitted and there is an additional scene, adapted from another TV episode, Uninvited Guests, in which the platoon trains to use wireless sets using tins and string.

Further reading

External links

Dad's Army (series 3) episodes
1969 British television episodes